Group C of the 2014–15 EuroChallenge consisted of Okapi Aalstar, Bakken Bears, Fraport Skyliners, and Borås Basket. Play began on 4 November and ended on 16 December 2014.

Teams

Standings

Results

Round 1

Round 2

Round 3

Round 4

Round 5

Round 6

References

Group C
2014–15 in Belgian basketball
2014–15 in Swedish basketball
2014–15 in German basketball
Basketball in Denmark